Meyer is a German surname, often but not always used with the Nobiliary particle "von" (of).  Notable people sharing this surname include:

 Christian Erich Hermann von Meyer (1801–1869), German palaeontologist, see m:de:Hermann von Meyer
 Gustav Ritter von Meyer (1834-1909), Bavarian politician, see m:de:Gustav Ritter von Meyer
 Carl Anton von Meyer (1795-1855), Russian botanist and explorer

See also 
 Meyer (disambiguation)
 Meyer (surname)
 Myer (disambiguation)
 Meyr (disambiguation)
 Meier
 Meir (disambiguation)
 Mayer (disambiguation)
 Maier
 Mayr
 Mair (disambiguation)
 Meyers
 Myers

German-language surnames
Jewish surnames
Yiddish-language surnames